Kanta Subbarao is an Indian virologist, molecular geneticist, and physician-scientist. She is director of the World Health Organization collaborating centre for reference and research on influenza. Subbarao is also a professor at the Doherty Institute.

Life 
Subbarao received a M.B.B.S. from Christian Medical College Vellore and a M.P. H. in epidemiology from the University of Oklahoma.

She is a virologist, physician-scientist, and molecular geneticist. Subbarao was convinced to join the influenza program at the National Institute of Allergy and Infectious Diseases (NIAID) when all of the positions in the respiratory syncytial virus program, which she wanted to join, were filled. She served as chief of the NIAID Emerging Respiratory Viruses Section. She is an elected fellow of the American Academy of Microbiology and the Infectious Diseases Society of America. In 2016, she joined World Health Organization collaborating centre for reference and research on influenza. She is a professor at the Doherty Institute. Subbarao became an elected fellow of the Australian Academy of Health and Medical Sciences in 2021.

References 

Living people
Place of birth missing (living people)
Year of birth missing (living people)
Indian virologists
Indian geneticists
Indian women biologists
Indian women medical doctors
21st-century Indian medical doctors
21st-century women physicians
Indian emigrants to Australia
National Institutes of Health people
Molecular geneticists
Women molecular biologists
21st-century Indian biologists
Fellows of the Australian Academy of Health and Medical Sciences
Women virologists
Women geneticists
Women medical researchers
Indian medical researchers
Physician-scientists
Influenza researchers
Fellows of the Infectious Diseases Society of America
Fellows of the American Academy of Microbiology
Academic staff of the University of Melbourne
World Health Organization officials
University of Oklahoma alumni